The 1994–95 Luxembourg Cup was the second playing of the Luxembourg Cup ice hockey tournament. Four teams participated in the tournament, which was won by the Chiefs Leuven.

Final standings

External links 
 Season on hockeyarchives.info

Luxembourg Cup
Luxembourg Cup (ice hockey) seasons